Paul Curtin (born 10 May 1954) is an Australian cricketer. He played five first-class matches for Northern Districts and South Australia between 1974 and 1981. His brothers, Barry and Peter, also played first-class cricket for South Australia.

See also
 List of South Australian representative cricketers

References

External links
 

1954 births
Living people
Australian cricketers
Northern Districts cricketers
South Australia cricketers
Cricketers from Adelaide